Tibor Végh (born 31 March 1956 in Székesfehérvár) is a retired Hungarian footballer who played as a defender. He had one cap as a member of the Hungarian National Football team in 1987.

References

External links

1956 births
Living people
Hungarian footballers
Association football defenders
Fehérvár FC players
MTK Budapest FC players
Hungary international footballers
Sportspeople from Székesfehérvár